Steve Antone (November 17, 1921 – April 19, 2014) was an American farmer and politician.

Born in Burley, Idaho, Antone served in the United States Army Air Forces during World War II. Antone was a farmer. He served in the Idaho House of Representatives, as a Republican, from 1969 until 1996. He died in Draper, Utah.

References 

1921 births
2014 deaths
People from Burley, Idaho
United States Army Air Forces soldiers
Republican Party members of the Idaho House of Representatives
United States Army Air Forces personnel of World War II